St Mark's Church is a Victorian Church of England parish church and listed building in Bournemouth, England.

History 
The church was built and consecrated in 1870 as part of Talbot Village.

The church became a Grade II listed building in 1972.

The church was expanded in 1991.

In March 2007, a car was set on fire next to the church. The fire spread to the roof of the old church which was destroyed.

Gallery

See also 

 List of churches in Bournemouth

References 

Churches completed in 1870
1870 establishments in England
Church of England church buildings in Dorset
Churches in Bournemouth
19th-century Church of England church buildings
Grade II listed churches in Dorset